Katiali is a town in the far north of Ivory Coast. It is a sub-prefecture of M'Bengué Department in Poro Region, Savanes District.

Katiali was a commune until March 2012, when it became one of 1126 communes nationwide that were abolished.

In 2014, the population of the sub-prefecture of Katiali was 8,861.

Villages
The 5 villages of the sub-prefecture of Katiali and their population in 2014 are:
 Bodonon (624)
 Katiali (7 092)
 Kolokpo (426)
 Komon (477)
 Lougnouble (242)

Notes

Sub-prefectures of Poro Region
Former communes of Ivory Coast